Vacationland may refer to:
An official slogan for the state of Maine
Vacationland (comedy show), a 2015 stand-up comedy show by John Hodgman
Vacationland (film), a 2006 film by Todd Verow
MV Vacationland, a ferry that crossed the Northumberland Strait between New Brunswick and PEI, Canada
Vacationland (ferry), a ferry that crossed the Straits of Mackinac in Michigan
Vacationland (Ohio), colloquial name for an area of North-east and North-central Ohio
Vacationland Hawaii, a former coastal subdivision on the island of Hawai'i